The BMW M4 DTM is a touring car constructed by the German car manufacturer BMW for the Deutsche Tourenwagen Masters. It was developed in 2013, and partook in DTM races from 2014 to 2020. Two versions were made: a naturally-aspirated V8 car through 2018, and a turbo Class 1 version starting in 2019. The M4 DTM is based on the production model BMW M4 and replaced the BMW M3 DTM after the 2013 season.

First generation (2014)

Development
The first model made its first appearance in the wind tunnel at the BMW Group's Aero Lab on April 22, just 13 days before the opening race of the 2013 season in Hockenheim. In the summer of 2013, while continuing with aerodynamic testing, the experts in Munich turned their attention to designing new suspension parts. The new components made their first on-track outing in December 2013 being trialled on the BMW M3 DTM at that point. The final parts for the chassis of the BMW M4 DTM were in production by the end of the year, allowing the BMW teams to assemble the first models of the new car in January and February. 300 days after the first test in the wind tunnel, the BMW M4 DTM made its track debut in Monteblanco on 11 February 2014.

Production
The last BMW M car to roll off the assembly line at the main BMW Plant in Munich did so back in 1991. After that, production shifted to the BMW Plant in Regensburg. Almost 23 years later, the assembly process returned to the main factory. BMW Motorsport engineers were located close by developing and improving the racing version of the new car. However, the BMW Plants in Regensburg and Dingolfing were still involved in the development of the BMW M4 DTM. For instance, the long test tracks at the modern production facilities were used for aerodynamic tests. Throughout the development phase, the BMW M4 DTM car was seen at the venue for the exhaustive quality control checks performed on all BMW M cars.

Lightweight construction
The use of carbon is widespread in motor racing and virtually the entire body of the BMW M4 DTM is made of this ultra-light and durable material. The weight reduction and consequent lowering of the centre of gravity are key to the car's performance on the racetrack. The weight of the BMW M4 DTM, with driver, is 1,110 kilograms.

Engine

BMW M4 DTM carried over the existing P66 V8 engine that was previously used by its predecessor BMW M3 DTM and conforms to the 2000 DTM engine regulations. The BMW P66 engine generates approx. 480 bhp with the air restrictor specified in the technical regulations. It is made up of 800 different components, consisting of 3,900 individual parts. When designing the DTM drivetrain, BMW Motorsport took full advantage of the technological know-how within the BMW Group. The high-tech foundry connected to BMW Plant Landshut accounts for the large cast parts, such as the cylinder head and crankcase, which it does for the production of the six-cylinder in-line engine for the BMW M4 Coupé as well. 

The BMW M4 DTM accelerates from 0 to 100 km/h in about three seconds. Only ten engines are permitted for all eight BMWs over the course of the entire season. 

The engine's power is transferred via a sequential six-speed sport gearbox, which is operated pneumatically using shift paddles mounted on the steering wheel. The gearbox is one of the standard components, which are used by all the DTM manufacturers. It has 11 final drive ratios, which allow the engineers and drivers to react to the respective circuit and engine characteristics when setting the car up.

Debut
With the homologation of the M4 DTM completed on 3 March 2014, the car's race debut was at the 2014 Hockenheimring 1 Deutsche Tourenwagen Masters round on 4 May 2014. BMW Team RMG's Marco Wittmann scored his M4 DTM's first victory in their M4 debut. Two weeks later in Motorsport Arena Oschersleben, BMW Team RMG's Marco Wittmann scored his M4 DTM's first pole position after Audi's Miguel Molina was stripped of pole position.

Teams and drivers
In the 2014 DTM season lined-up eight drivers on for four teams. Augusto Farfus and Joey Hand start for BMW Team RBM. Bruno Spengler and Martin Tomczyk for BMW Team Schnitzer. Timo Glock and António Félix da Costa start for BMW Team MTEK. Marco Wittmann and Maxime Martin start for BMW Team RMG. Wittmann won the championship with four wins, and Martin won a race.

In the 2015 DTM season lined-up eight drivers on for four teams. Augusto Farfus and Tom Blomqvist start for BMW Team RBM. Bruno Spengler and Timo Glock for BMW Team Schnitzer. António Félix da Costa and Martin Tomczyk start for BMW Team MTEK. Marco Wittmann and Maxime Martin start for BMW Team RMG. Five different drivers claimed a win.

In the 2016 DTM season lined-up eight drivers on for four teams. Maxime Martin and Tom Blomqvist start for BMW Team RBM. António Félix da Costa and Timo Glock for BMW Team Schnitzer. Bruno Spengler and Augusto Farfus start for BMW Team MTEK. Marco Wittmann and Timo Glock start for BMW Team RMG. Wittmann won the championship with three wins.

In the 2017 DTM season lined-up six drivers on for two teams. Maxime Martin, Bruno Spengler and Tom Blomqvist start for BMW Team RBM while Marco Wittmann, Augusto Farfus and Timo Glock start for BMW Team RMG.

In the 2018 DTM season lined-up six drivers on for two teams. Philipp Eng, Bruno Spengler and Joel Eriksson start for BMW Team RBM while Marco Wittmann, Augusto Farfus and Timo Glock remained same for BMW Team RMG.

Achievements
As of August 2017, BMW M4 DTM scored 16 victories, 20 poles, 13 fastest laps, 1 constructor title (2015) and 2 driver titles (courtesy of Marco Wittmann in 2014 and 2016).

Gallery

Second generation (2019) 

The BMW M4 DTM Turbo is a "Class 1" touring car constructed by the German car manufacturer BMW for use in the Deutsche Tourenwagen Masters. It is a turbocharged variant of its predecessor, the BMW M4 DTM that had a naturally-aspirated engine. The M4 DTM Turbo is still based on the production BMW M4. The BMW M4 DTM Turbo made its DTM debut in the 2019 DTM season. The M4 DTM Turbo is the BMW's second turbo-powered DTM car.

Debut
The first shakedown run of the BMW M4 DTM Turbo was on 27 October 2018, by Bruno Spengler at BMW headquarters in Munich, Germany. The official race debut of BMW M4 DTM Turbo was at the 2019 Hockenheimring 1 DTM round on 4 May 2019. BMW Team RMG's Marco Wittmann won the inaugural pole and won the first race with the M4 DTM Turbo car.

References

External links

M4 DTM Naturally-aspirated
Deutsche Tourenwagen Masters cars